Jean Grouet was a French publisher alleged to have stolen the manuscript of The 120 Days of Sodom by the Marquis de Sade. 

A friend of Françoise Sagan, Grouet founded Éditions Rupture and achieved success in 1977 with the publication of Rafaël Pividal's Pays Sages. 

His success was short-lived and he borrowed the manuscript of 120 Days of Sodom from its rightful owner, Natalie de Noailles -- daughter of Viscount Charles de Noailles and Marie-Laure de Noailles, a direct descendant of Sade. In 1982 Grouet smuggled the manuscript to Switzerland and sold it to Gérard Nordmann, a Swiss collector of erotica.

References 

French publishers (people)
Possibly living people
Year of birth missing